Thomas Frederick Bathurst  (born 17 March 1948), is an England-born Australian jurist who served as Chief Justice of the Supreme Court of New South Wales from 1 June 2011 to 5 March 2022. He has served as Lieutenant-Governor of New South Wales from 1 February 2012 to 5 December 2022.

Early years and education
Thomas Frederick Bathurst was born on St Patrick's Day 1948 in Richmond, Surrey, today part of Greater London. His parents were both Australian – his mother Joan Hartigan was a champion tennis player, while his father Hugh Moxon Bathurst was a public servant who was private secretary to Senator James Fraser when their engagement was announced. They married at St Mary's Cathedral, Sydney, in April 1947, before flying to Perth to board the Orion for England, where they planned to live for a few years while Joan resumed her tennis career.

In 1950, Bathurst returned to Sydney with his parents on the Strathmore, having spent the first few years of his life in Surrey. He was educated at Saint Ignatius' College, Riverview and in 1969 graduated from the University of Sydney with a Bachelor of Arts. Bathurst graduated in 1972 with a Bachelor of Laws from the Sydney Law School.

Career
Bathurst was admitted as a solicitor in New South Wales in 1972 and joined the Sydney city firm of E. J. (Ernest) Kirby & Co. where his mentor was Ann Plotke.

In 1977, Bathurst was called to the New South Wales Bar; he was made Queen's Counsel in 1987. His primary areas of practice included appellate work in banking law, commercial law and equity. He was president of the Australian Bar Association from 2008 to 2009, and president of the NSW Bar Association from 2010–11.

Notable cases as counsel
Bathurst appeared for AWA Limited in Daniels v Anderson (1995) 37 NSWLR 438, a leading Australian case on the duties of non-executive directors. He was appeared for Dyson Heydon QC in Heydon v NRMA Ltd (2000) 51 NSWLR 1 in a successful appeal against a finding that Heydon was negligent in giving legal advice to the respondent company, an important case concerning a barrister's liability for professional advice. He appeared before the High Court of Australia in Peters (WA) Ltd v Petersville Ltd (2001) 205 CLR 126, a case which reviewed the scope of the common law doctrine of restraint of trade.

Chief Justice
On the recommendation of the NSW government, NSW Governor Marie Bashir appointed Bathurst Chief Justice of the Supreme Court of New South Wales, effective 1 June 2011, and Lieutenant Governor of New South Wales from 1 February 2012. Tom Bathurst retired on 5 March 2022 and was succeeded by Andrew Bell.

Personal life
Bathurst is married to Robyn; the couple have two daughters, one of whom (at the time of Bathurst's own commission as Chief Justice), Emma, was a solicitor with Mallesons Stephen Jaques on secondment to a refugee organisation.

Honours
In the 2014 Queen's Birthday Honours List, Bathurst was invested as a Companion of the Order of Australia (AC), for "eminent service to the judiciary and to the law, to the development of the legal profession, particularly through the implementation of uniform national rules of conduct, and to the community of New South Wales". Bathurst was elected Fellow of the Royal Society of New South Wales in 2018.

References

External links
NSW Attorney-General media release, 13 May 2001. Retrieved 1 June 2011
NSW Attorney-General, Speech for Swearing In of Tom Bathurst as Chief Justice, 1 June 2011. Retrieved 1 June 2011
Official Website of the Governor of New South Wales

1948 births
Australian King's Counsel
20th-century King's Counsel
Chief Justices of New South Wales
Judges of the Supreme Court of New South Wales
Lieutenant-Governors of New South Wales
Living people
People educated at Saint Ignatius' College, Riverview
Companions of the Order of Australia
Fellows of the Royal Society of New South Wales